USNS Arctic (T-AOE-8), formerly USS Arctic (AOE-8), is the third ship in the Supply class of fast combat support ships and is the fifth supply ship to carry the name of the region surrounding the North Pole.

Arctic was built by  National Steel and Shipbuilding Company in San Diego, California.

Since decommissioning on 14 June 2002, Arctic has been operated by the Military Sealift Command, homeported in Earle, New Jersey. As a U.S. Naval Ship, Arctic is mostly civilian crewed and no longer carries the weapons systems she previously (as USS Arctic) was equipped with. One of these systems was the Phalanx CIWS.

Arctic has the speed to keep up with the carrier strike groups. She receives petroleum products, ammunition, and stores from shuttle ships and redistributes these items simultaneously to carrier strike group ships. This reduces the vulnerability of serviced ships by reducing alongside time.

Like other fast combat support ships, she is part of MSC's Naval Fleet Auxiliary Force.

USNS Arctic'''s cargo capacities:
Diesel Fuel Marine (DFM): 
JP-5 fuel: 
Bottled gas: 800 bottles
Ordnance stowage: 1,800 tons
Chill and freeze stowage: 400 tons
Water: 

US Army helicopter crash
The crash killed a soldier, Staff Sergeant James R. Stright, 29, and injured eight other service members.

Sources

External links

 Official MSC ship website
 

 

Supply-class fast combat support ships
1993 ships